This article lists the squads lists for badminton's 2019 Badminton Asia Mixed Team Championships. Rankings stated are per tournament prospectus based on BWF World Ranking for 19 February 2019.

Group A
Group A consists of Japan and Hong Kong.

Japan

Hong Kong

Group B
Group B consists of Chinese Taipei, India and Singapore.

Chinese Taipei

India

Singapore

Group C
Group C consists of Indonesia, Thailand and Sri Lanka.

Indonesia

Thailand

Sri Lanka

Group D
Group D consists of China, Malaysia and Macau.

China

Malaysia

Macau

References

2019 Badminton Asia Mixed Team Championships